Ana Patricia Hontiveros-Pagkalinawan (born Ana Patricia Navarro Hontiveros; March 10, 1967), better known as Pia Hontiveros, is a Filipina broadcast journalist. She is the sister of Ginggay and Risa Hontiveros. She is also the cousin of the 80's pop singer, Leah Navarro and 2000's singer Barbie Almalbis.

Career
Hontiveros is the Chief Correspondent for CNN Philippines, the anchor of the network's flagship newscast News Night, and the host of weekly political talk show Politics As Usual. She was the host of the political talk show News.PH from 2012–2017, and anchor of the global newscast Global Newsroom from 2016–2017.

She was a correspondent for the ABS-CBN News Channel (ANC) from 1996 to 2011 and as a  reporter from 1989 to 1996. She served as Political Correspondent and as an anchor and host of the television shows Top Story, Shop Talk, and Strictly Politics on the ABS-CBN News Channel (ANC).

Hontiveros graduated in 1989 with a Bachelor of Arts degree in Interdisciplinary studies at the Ateneo de Manila University.

Television

References

1967 births
ABS-CBN News and Current Affairs people
CNN people
Solar News and Current Affairs people
Filipino television news anchors
Hiligaynon people
Living people
People from Manila
University of California, Berkeley alumni